Euzophera subnitidella is a species of snout moth in the genus Euzophera. It was described by Émile Louis Ragonot in 1887, and is known from Russia (Marghilan and Altai).

References

Moths described in 1887
Phycitini
Moths of Asia